The 1964 Southern Miss Southerners football team was an American football team that represented the University of Southern Mississippi as an independent during the 1964 NCAA University Division football season. In their sixteenth year under head coach Thad Vann, the team compiled a 6–3 record.

Schedule

References

Southern Miss
Southern Miss Golden Eagles football seasons
Southern Miss Southerners football